Silvertown is a district in the London Borough of Newham, in east London, England. It lies on the north bank of the Thames and was historically part of the parishes of West Ham and East Ham, hundred of Becontree, and the historic county of Essex. Since 1965, Silvertown has been part of the London Borough of Newham, a local government district of Greater London.  It forms part of the London E16 postcode district along with Canning Town and Custom House.

The area was named after the factories established by Stephen William Silver in 1852, and is now dominated by the Tate & Lyle sugar refinery and the John Knight ABP animal rendering plant.

A £3.5billion redevelopment of part of the district was approved in 2015.

History
In 1852 S.W. Silver & Company moved to the area from Greenwich and established a rubber works, originally to make waterproof clothing. This subsequently developed into the works of the India Rubber, Gutta Percha and Telegraph Works Company, which constructed and laid many submarine cables. By the 1860s a number of manure and chemical works and petroleum storage depots had been set up. In 1864, the area became an ecclesiastical parish of its own, centred on the church of St Mark's.

Sugar refiners in the area were joined by Henry Tate in 1877 and Abram Lyle in 1881, whose companies merged in 1921 to form Tate & Lyle. Prior to the merger, which occurred after they had died, the two men were bitter business rivals, although they had never met. Tate & Lyle still has two large refineries in the area.

In 1889 Silver's factory was the scene of a twelve-week-long strike by the majority of its 3,000 workers. The strikers were demanding higher pay and were inspired by the recent successes of New Unionism in the East End of London. Management refused to negotiate with the strikers who had immense popular support. Leading figures in the strike included Tom Mann and Eleanor Marx. The workers were eventually starved back to work, with many being victimised for their role. In the aftermath of the strike, Silver's declared a half-yearly dividend of 5 percent. The rest of the industry congratulated Silver's management for holding a line against New Unionism.

On 19 January 1917, parts of Silvertown were devastated by a massive TNT explosion at the Brunner-Mond munitions factory, in what is known as the Silvertown explosion. Seventy three people died and hundreds were injured in one of the largest explosions ever experienced in the British Isles.

In the early 20th century the area suffered greatly from road congestion due to being located between the Thames and the Royal Docks, then the largest and one of the busiest dock groups in the world. The area was cut off for much of the time by lifting bridges over dock entrances and level crossings which were closed for up to three-quarters of each hour by train movements. This led in the early 1930s to the construction of the elevated Silvertown Way, one of the earliest urban flyovers.

On the first night of The Blitz, Tate and Lyle's sugar refinery, John Knight's Primrose Soapworks, and the Silvertown Rubber Works were all badly damaged by bombing.<ref>{{cite web |url=http://www.portcities.org.uk/london/server/show/conMediaFile.399/Smoke-from-the-bombed-factories-in-Silvertown.html |title=Smoke from the bombed factories in Silvertown (image) |archiveurl=https://web.archive.org/web/20081202080532/http://www.portcities.org.uk/london/server/show/ConMediaFile.399/Smoke-from-the-bombed-factories-in-Silvertown.html |archivedate=2 December 2008 |website=Port Cities |access-date=23 November 2008}}</ref>

Silver's was eventually taken over by the British Tyre and Rubber Co, later known as BTR Industries. The site closed in the 1960s and is now the Thameside Industrial Estate. Another major local employer was the Loders and Nucoline plant at Cairn Mills, a traditional port oleo industry and formerly part of Unilever. This originally milled seeds but later concentrated on production of fats from palm kernel oil.

The area was part of the ancient parishs of West Ham and East Ham, Essex, from the 12th century onwards.  The Local Government Act 1894 created East Ham Urban District. West Ham became a county borough in 1900, before merging with East Ham to create the new London Borough of Newham in 1965.

Regeneration

The residential area of Britannia Village was developed in the 1990s.

On 21 April 2015, Newham Council gave planning permission to The Silvertown Partnership for a new £3.5 billion redevelopment in the area.  The  development will provide offices, a tech hub, 3,000 new homes and brand experience pavilions. A school, health centre and shops are also included in the plan and a new bridge will cross the Royal Docks to get people to Custom House station and Crossrail.

The Silvertown Partnership were selected as the development partner to take forward the regeneration of the site. Their plan was to develop the site with homes, restaurants, commercial buildings, local convenience retail facilities, and significant public realm for community use. They predicted that it would provide up to 20,700 new jobs, up to 3,000 homes and contribute £260m each year of gross value to the London economy. The redevelopment is planned to include the restoration of former flour factory Millennium Mills.

In January 2015, the Mayor of London announced an initial £12m of government funding to start work on demolishing part of Millennium Mills and clearing it of asbestos. Prior to this latest development, the area was transformed in the 1970s by the construction of the Thames Barrier, an adjacent park, new housing areas and London City Airport.  In the mid-1990s much of the business activity in the area was centred on the brewing firm Bass.  In 2007 Prince Richard, Duke of Gloucester visited Silvertown, to formally open the new Silvertown Ambulance Station on North Woolwich Road.

Education

Maritime

The Tate & Lyle Thames Refinery is a safeguarded wharf in the Port of London. It is one of the largest sugar refineries in the world, with a capacity of 1.2 million tonnes per annum. The Raw Sugar and Refined and Shore Berth jetties include two bulk-handling crane. The terminal commodities are sugar, as dry bulks, and edible and vegetable oils, as liquid bulks: it exports globally and imports from Fiji, Caribbean, Africa and South America.

Transport

From 2020/21 a new station at Custom House station will provide transport to and from the area, using the trackbed of the old North London Line. There is passive provision for a stop serving Silvertown to be built in future.

The nearest Docklands Light Railway stations is West Silvertown. Access was much improved by an extension of the Docklands Light Railway from Canning Town to Woolwich Arsenal, which opened on 2 December 2005. However, the old Silvertown railway station on the North London Line, was closed in 2006.

The London Cable Car connects Silvertown with the Greenwich peninsula.

London City Airport is located on the eastern edge of Silvertown. A new bridge to connect Silvertown with Crossrail's Custom House station is one of the features of a £3.5bn redevelopment plan for London's Royal Docks.

The Silvertown Tunnel is a road tunnel under the Thames which will open in 2025 and provide a toll route to the Greenwich peninsula.

Popular culture
Silvertown is featured in a ballad by Mark Knopfler, titled Silvertown Blues, which describes the area as it was before redevelopment.

The district also features in Charlie Connelly's book, Attention All Shipping. In the first chapter "Sea, Soup and Silvertown" the author describes his grandparents' flight from the area during The Blitz and the inspiration for the book.

Melanie McGrath's book Silvertown is a novelistic account of her grandmother's life in the area, where she and her husband ran a cafe.The Sugar Girls'', by Duncan Barrett and Nuala Calvi, tells the true stories of women who worked at Tate & Lyle's Silvertown factories, and features much detail on the area.

Notable people
Frank Bailey (1925–2015), firefighter

See also
Silvertown explosion
Silvertown Tunnel

References

External links

 Silvertown Official Redevelopment Website
 Project Silvertown: A film by Ravensbourne students 
 Abandoned communities ... Central Silvertown
 Stories from Silvertown - Eastside Community Heritage
 The Sugar Girls official website

 
Districts of the London Borough of Newham
Areas of London
Food processing in London
Cable manufacture in London
Districts of London on the River Thames
Port of London